The Down-Dublin rivalry is a Gaelic football rivalry between Irish county teams Down and Dublin, who first played each other in 1977. The fixture has been an infrequent one in the history of the championship, and therefore the rivalry is not as intense between the two teams. Down's home ground is the Páirc Esler and Dublin's home ground is Parnell Park, however, all of their championship meetings have been held at neutral venues, usually Croke Park.

While Dublin have the highest number of Leinster titles and Down are in fifth position on the roll of honour in Ulster, they have also enjoyed success in the All-Ireland Senior Football Championship, having won 30 championship titles between them to date.

All-time results

Legend

Senior

References

Dublin
Dublin county football team rivalries